Sugar is an album by vocalist Etta Jones which was recorded in 1989 and released on the Muse label.

Reception

The AllMusic review by Scott Yanow stated "Etta Jones' long string of recordings during the final part of her career for Muse and High Note are some of the most rewarding of her life. Her voice was naturally not as youthful as earlier and her range gradually shrunk, but she was very soulful and had a way of wailing out notes that made each song her own. On Sugar, the first four numbers have her joined by a rhythm section that is hurt slightly by Horace Ott's dated-sounding keyboards. The other four numbers have more suitable accompaniment".

Track listing
 "Sugar" (Maceo Pinkard, Edna Alexander, Sidney D. Mitchell) – 4:36
 "So I Love You" (Carroll Coates) – 6:02
 "That's All There Is to That" (Clyde Otis, Kelly Owens) – 4:42
 "All the Way" (Jimmy Van Heusen, Sammy Cahn) – 6:18
 "He's Funny That Way" (Neil Moret, Richard A. Whiting) – 4:20
 "Blow Top Blues" (Leonard Feather, Jane Feather) – 5:55
 "This Is Always" (Harry Warren, Mack Gordon) – 5:07
 "Side by Side" (Harry M. Woods) – 4:45

Personnel
Etta Jones – vocals
Houston Person – tenor saxophone
George Devens – vibraphone
Randy Johnston – guitar
Stan Hope  – piano (tracks 5–8)
Horace Ott – keyboards (tracks 1–5)
Wilbur Bascomb (tracks 1–4), Peter Martin Weiss (tracks 5–8) – bass
Cecil Brooks III (tracks 1–4), Bertel Knox (tracks 5–8)  – drums
Ralph Dorsey – congas, percussion
Earl Coleman (track 7), Della Griffin (track 8) – vocals

References

Muse Records albums
Etta Jones albums
Albums recorded at Van Gelder Studio
1990 albums